The following highways are numbered 399:

Canada
Manitoba Provincial Road 399
 Quebec Route 399

Japan
 Japan National Route 399

United States
  U.S. Route 399 (former)
  Arkansas Highway 399
  Florida State Road 399
  Louisiana Highway 399
  Nevada State Route 399
  New York State Route 399
  Tennessee State Route 399
  Texas State Highway Spur 399
  Virginia State Route 399